Sophia Ewaniuk  (born May 10, 2002) is a Canadian actress who landed her first major role as Emma Conroy in ABC's series Happy Town,<ref>{{cite web | url=http://site.abc.go.com/fallpreview/index?pn=happytown | title='Fall Preview: 'Happy Town | publisher=ABC | accessdate=November 25, 2011}}</ref> a role for which she had been nominated as a recurring lead in a television series at the 2011 Young Artist Awards.

Previously, Sophia had appeared as Riley Adler on CTV’s drama Flashpoint in the season 3 episode "Severed Ties", which earned her a Young Artist Award nomination as a guest star in a television series. She has also appeared in the USA Network series Covert Affairs in the episode "The Outsiders".

Sophia has appeared as Young Gretl in the movie Witchslayer Gretl, an original Sci Fi Channel movie starring Shannen Doherty. She voiced the twins, Ada and Ida, in the TVOKids/Disney Junior animated series Ella the Elephant.

Ewaniuk's older brother Jacob is also a child actor.

Filmography
 Happy Town (7 episodes, 2010) as Emma Conroy
 Flashpoint (1 episode, 2010) as Riley Adler
 Sundays at Tiffany's (TV movie, 2010) as Principal (uncredited)
 Ninety-one (short film, 2010) as Young Cate
 Covert Affairs (1 episode, 2011) as Roma Young Girl
 Monday Report (3 episodes, 2011-2014) as Rick's Daughter
 Witchslayer Gretl (TV movie, 2012) as Young Gretl
 Ella the Elephant (voice role, 2012-2013) as Ada and Ida
 BeyWarriors: BeyRaiderz (voice role, 1 episode, 2013) as Holly

Awards and nominations
 2011: nominated for Young Artist Award in the category "Best Performance in a TV Series - Guest Starring Young Actress Ten and Under" for her role as Riley Adler in Flashpoint 2011: nominated for Young Artist Award in the category "Best Performance in a TV Series - Recurring Young Actress Ten and Under" for her role as Emma Conroy in Happy Town''

References

External links

 
 Sophia Ewaniuk at mediakidvids.net
 The Outsiders at rdanderson.com
 

2002 births
Living people
Canadian child actresses
Canadian film actresses
Canadian people of Ukrainian descent
Canadian television actresses
Canadian voice actresses
Place of birth missing (living people)